is a Japanese actor and television personality from Tokyo. He is married to professional golfer Riko Higashio.

Biography
Junichi Ishida was born in Tokyo. His father was a foreign correspondent for NHK, and he lived in the U.S. from the ages of three to six. He attended Waseda University, but dropped out before graduating.

Ishida has been married three times. He first married while he was a student, fathering a son, Issei Ishida, who became an actor and musician. They had one daughter, Sumire, who became an actress. He was subsequently in a relationship with TV personality , but their 8-year relationship ended in 2004.

In October 2009, Ishida announced his engagement to professional golfer Riko Higashio. They registered their marriage on 12 December 2009. Their first son, was born on 5 November 2012.

Ishida is famous for not wearing socks in public. He claims that this started after he saw Italians not wearing socks while he was in Milan in 1985.

Appearances

Film
Tekkihei, Tonda (1980)
 Against (1981)
  (1982)
  (1983)
 Tokyo: The Last Megalopolis (1988)
  (1989)
  (2000)

Television
Kage no Gundan4 (1984)
 Marco Polo, (1982-1983) TBS
 The Cowra Breakout (1984)

Books

References

External links
  
 Sky Corporation agency profile
 

1954 births
Living people
Male actors from Tokyo
Waseda University alumni